Gary Kendall is a Canadian bassist, vocalist and band leader, best known for his longstanding association with the Downchild Blues Band and co-creator of the Kendall Wall Band.

Biography
Gary Kendall, originally from Thunder Bay, Ontario, has been a working musician since the late 1960s.  He is a multiple Maple Blues Award winner as bassist of the year and a Juno Award winner with the Downchild Blues Band. His distinguished musical career was so honoured by the Maple Blues Awards as early as 1993 and a Juno Award in 2014. Since 1999, Kendall has acted as the musical director of the Maple Blues awards program.

Kendall played with the Downchild Blues Band during the 1979–1983 period.  With fellow Downchild alumnus Cash Wall, Kendall subsequently formed the Kendall Wall Band, which was well known in Toronto and area during the 1980s and early 1990s.  As the house band at Toronto's Black Swan Tavern, the Kendall Wall Blues Band played with such blues legends as A.C. Reed, Pinetop Perkins, Eddy Clearwater, Tinsley Ellis, Little Willie Littlefield, Chubby Carrier, Bernard Allison, Eddie C. Campbell, Lefty Dizz, Eddie "Clean Head" Vinson, Eddie Shaw, Carey Bell and Fenton Robinson.

Kendall has also performed with such artists as Snooky Pryor, Luther "Guitar Junior" Johnson, Big Jay McNeeley, Bob Margolin, Big Dave MacLean, Duke Robillard, Morgan Davis, Zora Young and Phil Guy.  He has recorded with Downchild, The Gary Kendall Band, The Maple Blues Revue, Son Roberts, Ray Edge, David Vest, Chris Murphy, Little Bobby & The Jumpstarts, Peter Schmidt & Shane Scott, Brian Blain, Maria Aurigema.

From 1994 to 2010, Kendall was the talent buyer/publicist for the Silver Dollar Room, one of Toronto's best known blues bars, which has operated continuously, in various formats, since 1958.

Kendall rejoined Downchild in 1995 and has continued to play and record with the band since that time, in addition to contributing to the work of other musicians and leading his own band, The Gary Kendall Band. Kendall performs with noted bands as the Hogtown All Stars, The Mighty Duck Blues Band, The Swingin’ Blackjacks and Big Groove. His association as musical director of the Maple Blues Awards resulted in the formation of the Maple Blues Band, with which Kendall continues to be associated and to tour.

The documentary 
In 2012, Kendall was involved in a live concert documentary that was produced outlining the 40-year career of the Downchild Blues Band. Through their musical legacy Downchild, had a huge impact on Canadian and American culture, influencing a new generation of young musicians including Colin James, Jeff Healey and many more to continue the blues tradition in Canada. Downchild was the inspiration for actor Dan Aykroyd’s Blues Brothers phenomenon. This will be the second documentary Kendall has been interviewed and involved with, in 2015 Kendall would release a documentary about the Kendall Wall Band, the band he co-created with the late Cash Wall. This documentary outlined the band arrived at a time when it was a crucial period for blues music in Canada, let alone in the city of Toronto. They provided upcoming musicians the opportunity to perform with a working band then, when International and Canadian blues musicians came to town to play the Black Swan they had the Kendall Wall Band backing them up.

Awards and recognition
Blues with a Feeling Award
1993 Toronto Blues Society – Honouring distinguished career

Maple Blues Award
1997 Bassist of The Year
1999 Bassist of the Year
2000 Bassist of the Year
2002 Bassist of the Year
2005 Bassist of the Year
2007 Bassist of the Year
2012 Bassist of the Year
2013 Bassist of the Year

Jazz Report Award
1998 Blues Group of The Year – Downchild

Keeping The Blues Alive Award
2002 Thunder Bay Blues Society

Thunder Blues Award
2002 City of Thunder Bay

Juno Award
2014 Blues Album of the Year – Can You Hear The Music – Downchild

Hammer Blues Award
2015 Ensemble of the Year – The Mighty Duck Blues Band

Discography

With The Downchild Blues Band
Studio albums
1979: We Deliver
1980: Road Fever
1980: Double Header (double album re-issue Straight Up/We Deliver)
1981: Blood Run Hot (with Spencer Davis)
1982: But I’m on the Guest List
1988: We Deliver/Straight Up (double album re-issue)
1997: Lucky 13
2004: But I'm on the Guest List (re-issue)
2004: Blood Run Hot (re-issue)
2004: We Deliver (re-issue)
2004: Come On In
2007: Live at the Palais Royale
2009: I Need A Hat
2013: Can You Hear The Music
2017: ``Something I`ve Done
2020: " 50th Anniversary, Live At The Toronto Jazz Festival
Compilations
1998: A Case of The Blues – The Best of Downchild
2000: A Matter of Time – The Downchild Collection
2003: Body of Work – The Downchild Collection Volume 2

Solo
2004: Dusty and Pearl
2021: Dusty & Pearl Revisited Volume One

With the Gary Kendall Band
2008: Feels Real Strong With the Maple Blues Revue
2008: Live at Twisted Pines With the Kendall Wall Band 
2013: The Way We Was (re-issue of the almost lost studio recordings from 1987 to 1988)

With other artists
1999: Blowin' The Horn – Chris Murphy – (Co-producer/with Michael Fonfara)
2001: Tickets in the Glove Box – Little Bobby and The Jumpstarts
2002: Live at Healey's – Jeff Healey & Friends
2003: Blues Approved – Peter Schmidt and Shane Scott
2004: I'm A Happy Guy – Chris Murphy
2004: Take Me – Maria Aurigema
2005: 20 Years – Toronto Blues Society
2005: Overqualified for the Blues – Brian Blain
2005: Soul Connection – Ray Edge – (Producer)
2007: 4 On The Floor – David Owen – (Producer)
2011: Tell That Story – Son Roberts
2012: East Meets Vest – David Vest – (Co-Producer) 
2014: Roadhouse Revelation – David Vest – (Co-Producer) 
2014: Collective Blues Agreement – Tobin Spring
2014: Long Way Home – Maria Aurigema
2015: Our Sunday Best – Braithwaite and Whiteley
2015: Livin` Life – David Owen (Producer)
2016: Devestatin` Rhythm – David Vest (co-producer)
2016: The Long Road Home – Rootbone
2016: Blues Country – Braithwaite & Whiteley
2017: Duck Soup – The Mighty Duck Blues Band
2018: Say It Judy Brown (co-producer)
2020: I'm Not Fifty Anymore''-Brian Blain
2021: Instramentalz (compilation) feat. The Maple Blues Band, Chris Murphy, The Gary Kendall Band (producer)
2022: "Hog Wild"-The Hogtown Allstars (bassist, songwriter, co-producer)

Citations

External links
 
Bluestime Productions Website
Gary Kendall credits at AllMusic

Canadian blues guitarists
Canadian male guitarists
Living people
Musicians from Thunder Bay
Winners of the Geneva International Music Competition
1947 births
20th-century Canadian bass guitarists
21st-century Canadian bass guitarists
Male bass guitarists
20th-century Canadian male musicians
21st-century Canadian male musicians